Route 207 is a provincial highway located in the Montérégie region of Quebec. The highway starts at the junction of Route 205 in Saint-Urbain-Premier and ends northeast at the junctions of Route 132 and Route 138 just south of the Mercier Bridge at the Kahnawake Mohawk Reserve, southwest of the island of Montreal.

Municipalities along Route 207

 Saint-Urbain-Premier
 Saint-Isidore
 Saint-Constant
 Kahnawake

Major intersections

See also
 List of Quebec provincial highways

References

External links
 Official Transports Quebec Road Network Map 
 Route 207 at Google Maps

207